Rasaathi was a 2019-2020 Tamil-language television series starring Pavani Reddy in the titular role (who later her character was replaced by Debjani Modak). Whilst Devayani, Baladitya and Vichithra in the supporting roles and was directed by Jawahar. The show premiered on 23 September 2019 in Sun TV and ended on 3 April 2020 due to COVID-19 pandemic.

Cast

Main
Pavani Reddy (Episodes 1-100) as Raasathi
 Debjani Modak (Episodes 101-160) as Raasathi (Replaced Pavani)
Devayani as Illavarasi Soundravalli 
 Aditya as Rajadurai / Pandian 
 Vichithra as Chinthamani

Recurring
 Senthil as Alagarswamy (Rasaathi's uncle)
 Sulakshana as Alamelu (Pandian's adoptive mother)
 Keerthi Jai Dhanush as Kayal Shiva (Chintamani's daughter)   
 Thennavan and Ramesh Pandit as Rasappan: Rasaathi's stepbrother
 Vijayakumar as Shanmugasundaram: Rasaathi and Rasappan's father (Died in serial)
 Nithya Ravindran as Saraswathi: Shanmugasundaram's first wife (Rasathi's mother)
 Reena as Shanmugasundaram's second wife (Rasappan's mother)
 Manoj Kumar as Chintamani's brother(Pandian's adoptive father) 
 Sivan Sreenivasan as Tharmahartha
 Meena Vemuri as Sudamani (Chinthamani's sister)
 Sabari as Shiva (Alagarswamy's son, Kayal's husband) 
 Subalakshmi Rangan as Menaka Madhavan (Sudamani's daughter, Madhavan's wife) 
 Rohith as Santhosh 
 Usha Sai as Kalyani
 Mahesh Subramaniam as Madhavan (Soundaravalli's 2nd brother)
 Pollachi Babu as Anjoor

References

External links
 

Sun TV original programming
2010s Tamil-language television series
2019 Tamil-language television series debuts
Tamil-language television shows